Ralph Francis "Buzz" Boyle (February 9, 1908 – November 12, 1978) was a professional baseball player who played as an outfielder in Major League Baseball from 1929 through 1935. He played for the Boston Braves and Brooklyn Dodgers. In 1934, his most productive year in the majors, Boyle hit .305 for the Dodgers, led the major leagues with  20 outfield assists, and received National League MVP votes. Born in Cincinnati, he attended Xavier University.

In 366 games over five seasons, Boyle posted a .290 batting average (389-for-1343) with 185 runs, 58 doubles, 24 triples, 12 home runs, 125 RBI, 24 stolen bases, 116 bases on balls, .347 on-base percentage and .395 slugging percentage. He finished his career with a .970 fielding percentage playing at all three outfield positions.

Boyle also managed for the Muskegon Lassies of the All-American Girls Professional Baseball League in its 1946 season. Noted sports columnist Steve Rushin is his great-nephew.

Boyle died in 1978 at his hometown of Cincinnati at the age of 70.

External links

1908 births
1978 deaths
Akron Yankees players
Albany Senators players
All-American Girls Professional Baseball League managers
Baltimore Orioles (IL) players
Baseball players from Cincinnati
Boston Braves players
Brooklyn Dodgers players
Cincinnati Reds scouts
Elder High School alumni
Kansas City Blues (baseball) players
Major League Baseball outfielders
Montreal Expos scouts
Newark Bears (IL) players
Norfolk Tars players
Providence Grays (minor league) players
Xavier Musketeers baseball players